The America Zone was one of the two regional zones of the 1935 International Lawn Tennis Challenge.

6 teams entered the America Zone: 4 teams competed in the North & Central America Zone, while 2 teams competed in the South America Zone. The winner of each sub-zone would play against each other to determine who moved to the Inter-Zonal Final to compete against the winner of the Europe Zone.

The United States defeated Mexico in the North & Central America Zone final, and Brazil defeated Uruguay in the South America Zone final. In the Americas Inter-Zonal Final, the United States received a walkover after Brazil withdrew, and went on to face Germany in the Inter-Zonal Final.

North & Central America Zone

Draw

Semifinals

Mexico vs. Cuba

United States vs. China

Final

Mexico vs. United States

South America Zone

Draw

Final

Uruguay vs. Brazil

Americas Inter-Zonal Final

United States vs. Brazil 
United States defeated Brazil by walkover.

References

External links
Davis Cup official website

Davis Cup Americas Zone
America Zone
International Lawn Tennis Challenge